Martha Reeves (born 1941) is a vowed Anglican solitary (or anchorite), with Rowan Williams, the former Archbishop of Canterbury, as bishop-protector. A graduate of the Madeira School (Class of 1959), she is also a Stanford-educated professor of theology who has written numerous articles and books under the name "Maggie Ross" as well as translated a number of Carthusian Novice Conferences. Reeves, at one time Desmond Tutu's spiritual director, was Bell Distinguished Professor in Anglican and Ecumenical Studies appointed to the Department of Philosophy and Religion, Kendall College of Arts and Sciences, The University of Tulsa. In 1995, "A Rite for Contemplative Eucharist" emerged while being a theologian-in-residence in an Episcopal church in the Diocese of Southern Ohio. In March 2008, she donated 'silence' to the Museum of Curiosity.. Ross as an interviewee also shared about silence in the 2015 documentary In Pursuit of Silence directed by Patrick Shen. In October 2016, she gave the lecture "Healing Silence' at Durham University for its "Spirituality, Theology, and Health Seminar Series." The Hay Festival has been an event for presenting about the 'work of silence' under the topic title "Maggie Ross Talks to Rachael Kerr".  She was an attendee of the 2018 Epiphany Conference on science and religion, a collaborative initiative between the Cambridge Epiphany Philosophers and the Oxford Monastic Institute. The 'work of silence' has touched grounds for many years now through the ravenwilderness blogspot, and an index of posts from 2006 to 2013 can be viewed from here and the entries from 2013 to 2020 here. The British & Irish Association for Practical Theology (BIAPT) had a planned inaugural event for its Spirituality Interest Special Group in 2020, with Ross as keynote speaker but was postponed. The keynote address "Silent Ways of Knowing" had been shared in four parts in Ross's blog. Reeves lives in Oxford, the United Kingdom, where a number of sermons and talks had been shared through the years in churches and academia around the area.

Books
The Fountain & the Furnace: The Way of Tears and Fire, Paulist Press (1987) 
Seasons of Death and Life: A Wilderness Memoir, HarperCollins  (1990) 
Pillars of Flame: Power, Priesthood, and Spiritual Maturity, Seabury Books (1992, & 2007) 
(translator from French) 'The Way of Silent Love: Carthusian Novice Conferences', A Carthusian, Cistercian Publications / Darton, Longman, & Todd (1993), 
'(translator) 'The Wound of Love: A Carthusian Miscellany', A Carthusian, Cistercian Publications / Darton, Longman, & Todd (1994), 
'(translator) 'The Call of Silent Love: Carthusian Novice Conferences', A Carthusian, Cistercian Publications / Darton, Longman, & Todd (1995), 
The Fire of Your Life, Seabury Books (2007) 
Writing the Icon of the Heart: In Silence Beholding, The Bible Reading Fellowship (BRF, 2011), 
The Fountain & the Furnace: The Way of Tears and Fire, Wipf & Stock (2014 Reprint Edition) 
Silence: A User's Guide: Volume 1: Process, Wipf & Stock/Darton, Longman, & Todd (2014), 
Seasons of Death and Life: A Wilderness Memoir, Wipf & Stock (2016 Reprint Edition) 
Silence: A User's Guide: Volume 2: Application, Wipf & Stock/Darton, Longman, & Todd (2018),

Journal Articles/Reviews 
 Ross, Maggie. Review of The Syriac Fathers on Prayer and the Spiritual Life by S. Brock; Harlots of the Desert: A Study of Repentance in Early Monastic Sources by B. Ward. The Journal of Roman Studies, Vol. 80 (1990), p. 259.
_"The Human Experience of God at Turning Points: A Theological Exposé of Spiritual Counterfeits," Vox Benedictina Vol. 7, Iss. 4,  (Oct 1990): 393.
 _"The Apophatic Ordinary," Anglican Theological Review, Volume: 74, Issue: 4, 1992) Pages: 456-464.
 _and Gillespie, Vincent, "The Apophatic Image: The Poetics of Effacement in Julian of Norwich," Medieval Mystical Tradition in England: Exeter Symposium 5,  ( 1992): Pages 53 – 77.
 "Apophatic Prayer as a Theological Model: Seeking Coordinates in the Ineffable, Notes for a Quantum Theology," Literature and Theology, Vol 7 Issue 4, December 1993.
"Sexuality, Otherness and the Truth of the Self," Vox Benedictina, Vol. 10, Iss. 2,  (Winter 1993): 334.
"The Seven Devils of Women's Ordination." Crossing the Boundary: What Will Women Priests Mean? Sue Walrond Skinner, ed. London: Mowbray, 1994, pp. 93-131.
"Socrates and the Cheshire Cat, or, Abhorring Horror Vacui," The Bell Lecture, University of Tulsa, 2000.
 & Gillespie, Vincent, ""With Mekeness Aske Perseverantly": On Reading Julian of Norwich," Mystics Quarterly, Vol. 30, No. 3/4 (September/December 2004), pp. 126-141.
"Simone Weil: Force, Fragility and the Art of Kenosis,” Colloquy XXIV, American Weil Society, The Center for Theological Inquiry, Princeton, NJ, April 2004.  
 "Jesus in the Balance: Interpretation in the Twenty-First Century," Word & World, Vol. 29 No. 2 Spring 2009.
 "Behold Not the Cloud of Experience," in E.A. Jones, ed., The Medieval Mystical Tradition in England: Exeter Symposium. D.S. Brewer, Cambridge, 2013.
Review of the Soul recreation. The contemplative-mystical piety of Puritanism by Tom Schwanda. The Journal of Ecclesiastical History; Cambridge Vol. 64, Iss. 2,  (Apr 2013): 423-424.
 "Silent witness," (Reform Interview) Reform Magazine, June 2015.
  "Maggie Ross, solitary and theologian." Interview by Terence Handley MacMath. Church Times, January 16, 2015.
"The Costliness of Commemoration," in On Commemoration: Global Reflections upon Remembering War,  Catherine Gilbert, Kate McLoughlin & Niall Munro, eds.  Peter Lang Ltd, International Academic Publishers; 1st edition (August 11, 2020).
Review, A History of Silence: From the Renaissance to the Present Day by Alain Corbin. Common Knowledge, Duke University Press, Volume 27 Issue 1, January 2021. p.126.

Published reviews on Ross's books

 Wentz, Richard E. The Fountain and the Furnace: The Way of Tears and Fire. The Christian Century, 1987-08-26, Vol.104 (24), p.728.
 McEntire, Sandra. The Fountain and the Furnace: The Way of Tears and Fire. Mystics Quarterly, Vol. 14, No. 4 (December 1988), pp. 213-214.
 Cameron, Helen. Pillars of Flame. Scottish Journal of Theology, Volume 42, Issue 04, November 1989, pp 621 - 622 DOI: 10.1017/S0036930600040448, Published online: 02 February 2009.
 Bishop, Barbara. The Fire of Your Life: A Solitude Shared. Mystics Quarterly, Vol. 16, No. 2 (June 1990), pp. 109-110.
 Crosswhite, James. Seasons of Death and Life: A Wilderness Memoir. Western American Literature, Volume 28, Number 2, Summer 1993, pp. 155-156 10.1353/wal.1993.0056
 Hess, Lisa M. Writing the Icon of the Heart: In Silence Beholding. Spiritus: A Journal of Christian Spirituality, Volume 14, Number 1, Spring  2014, pp. 128–130.
 Leslie, Gillian. Silence: A User's Guide. Volume I: Process. Theology 118(4).
 Weil, Louis. Silence: A User's Guide. Volume I: Process. Anglican Theological Review; Evanston Vol. 98, Iss. 1,  (Winter 2016): 215-216.
Wilbourne, David. Silence: A User's Guide. Volume II: Application. Church Times 20 APRIL 2018.
Nessan, Craig L. Silence: A User's Guide. Volume II: Application. Currents in Theology and Mission: The Theological Journal of the Lutheran School of Theology at Chicago and Wartburg Theological Seminary, October 2018.

Citations on Maggie Ross's 'work of silence' 
Note: On Julian of Norwich studies, the most cited article is Gillespie & Ross's "The Apophatic Image: The Poetics of Effacement in Julian of Norwich."
Panicker, Geevarghese, "Prayer With Tears: A Great Feast of Repentance," The Harp, Vol. IV No. 1,2,3,July 1991, pp. 111–133. 
Harigan, Emily Fowler, "THE POWER OF LANGUAGE BEYOND WORDS: LAW AS INVITATION," Harvard Civil Rights-Civil Liberties Law Review 67 (1991).  
Masson, Margaret Cynthea, "Crossing the Chasm: The Rhetoric of the Ineffable in Margery Kempe and Julian of Norwich," Ph.D. Diss., School of Graduate Studies, McMaster University (1995).
Dreyer, Elizabeth, "NARRATIVES OF THE SPIRIT: RECOVERING A MEDIEVAL RESOURCE," CTSA PROCEEDINGS 51 (1996): 45-90.
Brady, Veronica, "Aboriginal Spirituality," Literature & Theology, Vol. 10, No. 3, Special Issue: Religion, Literature and the Arts in Australia (September 1996), pp. 242–251.
Abbott, Christopher, "Piety and Egoism in Julian of Norwich: A Reading of Long Text Chapters 2 and 3," The Downside Review, October 1996. 
Hilles, Carol, "The sacred image and the healing touch: The Veronica in Julian of Norwich's Revelation of Love," Journal of Medieval and Early Modern Studies, Vol. 28, Iss. 3, (Fall 1998): 553-580.
Biollo, Elaine Marie, "A GOD WITH MANY NAMES: AN EXPLORATION OF THE NAMING OF GOD IN SHOWINGS BY JULIAN OF NORWICH," D.Th Diss., Regis College and The University of Toronto (Sept 1999). 
Longenecker-Inge, Denise Louise, "Re-examining the "Poet of Felicity": Desire and Redemption in the Theology of Thomas Traherne," Ph.D Thesis, Department of Theology and Religious Studies, King's College (2001). 
Volf, Miroslav & Katerberg, William Henry. The Future of Hope: Christian Tradition Amid Modernity and Postmodernity. Wm. B. Eerdmans Publishing, (2004). 
Castricum, Sarah B., "“IN COMFORT OF US ALLE: ” READING JULIAN OF NORWICH’S SHOWINGS IN THEIR LATE MEDIEVAL ENGLISH CONTEXT," Ph.D. Diss., Graduate School of Arts & Sciences, Boston College, April 2005. 
Ford, Michael. Song of the Nightingale: A Modern Spiritual Canticle. Paulist Press (2005). 
Laird, Martin. Into the Silent Land: A Guide to the Practice of Christian Contemplation. Oxford University Press (2006). 
Bauerschmidt, F.C., "Julian of Norwich - Incorporated," Modern Theology, Vol 13 No 1 (June 2008), pp 75–100.
Davis, Carmel Bendon. Mysticism and Space: Space and Spatiality in the Works of Richard Rolle, The Cloud of Unknowing Author, and Julian of Norwich. Catholic University of America Press (2008). 
Zimmermann, Elizabeth Farrell, "GOD’S TEACHERS: WOMEN WRITERS, DIDACTICISM, AND VERNACULAR RELIGIOUS TEXTS IN THE LATER MIDDLE AGES," Ph.D Diss., Graduate School, The Ohio State University (2009).  
McEntire, Sandra J., Ed. Julian of Norwich: A Book of Essays. Routledge (2013).  
Nelstrop, Louise, "Julian of Norwich’s Logophatic Discourse," in Christian Mysticism and Incarnational Theology: Between Transcendence and Immanence, Louise Nelstrop and Simon D. Podmore, eds., Ashgate Publishing 2013, pp. 191–216.  
Hunt, Hannah, "The Monk as Mourner: Gendered Eastern Christian Self-Identity in the Seventh Century," Journal of Medieval Monastic Studies (2013).  
Cervone, Cristina Maria. Poetics of the Incarnation: Middle English Writing and the Leap of Love. University of Pennsylvania (2013).  
Young, Glenn, "MYSTICAL ENCOUNTER AS HOMELY OTHERNESS IN JULIAN OF NORWICH'S A REVELATION OF LOVE," Magistra, Vol. 20, Iss. 2,  (Winter 2014): 22-37.
Willits, Catherine, "The Obfuscation of Bodily Sight in the Showings of Julian of Norwich," Journal of Literary & Cultural Disability Studies, Vol. 8, Iss. 1,  (2014): 81-96,126.
Raby, Michael, "The Phenomenology of Attention in Julian of Norwich’s A Revelation of Love," Medieval, Early Modern, Theory, Volume 26, 2014 - Issue 4, pp. 347-367.
Lewin, David, "Behold: Silence and Attention in Education," Journal of Philosophy of Education, Vol. 48, N0. 3, 2014.   
Williams, Rowan. The Edge of Words: God and the Habits of Language. Bloomsbury Continuum (2014). 
Woolley, Alison Rebecca, "Women Choosing Silence: Transformational Practices and Relational Perspectives," Ph.D. Diss., Department of Theology and Religion, University of Birmingham, May 2015, pp. 37-38.
Gosselin, Janna, "Blind Seeing: The Limits of Vision in the Texts of Julian of Norwich," Ph.D Diss., Department of English, University of Southern California, May 2015. 
Nelstrop, Louise, "Nakedness and Anthropology in Julian of Norwich and Maurice Merleau-Ponty: Conversation Partners or Dangerous Liaisons?" Medieval & Mystical Theology, Volume 25, 2016 - Issue 1, pp. 69–85.
Wolf, Johannes, "The Art of Arts: Theorising Pastoral Power in the English Middle Ages," Ph.D Diss., King's College, University of Cambridge (Jan 2017). 
Byland, Hannah Marie, "NECESSARY FICTIONS: READING AND VISIONARY LITERATURE IN PEARL, PIERS PLOWMAN, A REVELATION OF DIVINE LOVE, AND THE BOOK OF MARGERY KEMPE," Ph.D Diss., Graduate School, Cornell University (Dec 2017). 
Maxwell, Paul C., "Betrayal Trauma and Covenant: Theologically Understanding Abuse Trauma and Traumatically Reforming Theological Understanding,"  JOURNAL OF SPIRITUALITY IN MENTAL HEALTH, Volume 19 2017, Issue 4, pp. 241–267.  
Hess, Mary E., "White Religious Educators Resisting White Fragility: Lessons From Mystics," Religious Education, Vol. 112, 2017, Issue 1: Race, Racism, Anti-Racism, and Religious Education.
Runcorn, David. The Language of Tears: Their gift, mystery and meaning. Canterbury Press (2018).  
Bose, Mishtooni, "Piers Plowman and God's Thought Experiment," in Medieval Thought Experiments: Poetry, Hypothesis, and Experience in the European Middle Ages, ed. by Philip Knox, Jonathan Morton, and Daniel Reeve. Turnhout: BREPOLS (2018).  
Mozol, Alvenio Jr., "Noise of violent human speech and the restraint of contemplative silence," MST (Maryhill School of Theology) Review, Vol. 9, No. 2 (2018).
Book: Engaging Silence, Climbing Mt. Tabor: Faith-Life Meditations. Great Books Trading (2015).
Stanton, Helen, "A Theological Method and Models for Ministry: Reflections on Practice," British Journal of Theological Education, Volume 7 1995 - Issue 3, published online Feb 2016. 
 Crichton, Kieran, "Liminality of the body: a theological reflection on singing and kenosis," Practical Theology, Volume 12, 2019 - Issue 3: Special themed edition - Embodied Spiritual Practice(s).
Cirlot, Victoria, "LAS VISIONES DE JULIANA DE NORWICH ENTRE EL ESTILO GÓTICO Y LA ABSTRACCIÓN," REVISTA CHILENA DE LITERATURA, Abril 2019, Número 99, 35-59.
Dresvina, Juliana, "What Julian Saw: The Embodied Showings and the Items for Private Devotion," Religions (Apr 2019). 
Skilton, Andrew, Kyaw Phyo Pyi, and Krosby, Kate, "AFTERWORD - WAYS FORWARD," CONTEMPORARY BUDDHISM 2019, VOL. 20, NOS. 1–2, 372–377.
Jasper, David. Truth and the Church in a Secular Age. SCM Press (2019). 
Ho-Huan, Jenni. Be Still and Know. Wipf & Stock Publishers (2019). 
Kidd, Richard L., "The Art of Seeing," Journal of European Baptist Studies 19:2 (2019).
Wiebe, Ben. Jesus and Christian Origins: Directions toward a New Paradigm. Wipf & Stock Publishers (2019). 
Nelstrop, Louise. On Deification and Sacred Eloquence: Richard Rolle and Julian of Norwich. Routledge, (2019). 
Pattison, George. A Rhetorics of the Word: A Philosophy of Christian Life, Part II. Oxford University Press (2019).  
Williams, Rowan, "Hush now: An aphoristic and allusive account of quietness," TLS. Times Literary Supplement(Issue 6050), March 15, 2019.   
Noll, Sonja. The Semantics of Silence in Biblical Hebrew. BRILL (2020), p. 5.
Greenway-Clarke, Kirsty, "Written on the body: corporeality, desire, and the erotic in medieval women’s mystical writing," Theology & Sexuality, Vol 27 Issue 1, Dec 2020, pp. 62–86.
Barr, Jessica. Intimate Reading: Textual Encounters in Medieval Women’s Visions and Vitae. University of Michigan Press, (2020). 
Salih, Sarah, "Julian of Norwich, the Carrow Psalter and Embodied Cinema," in Visions and Voice-Hearing in Medieval and Early Modern Contexts. PALGRAVE, 2020, pp. 147–174.

References

External links
Voice in the Wilderness: a blog by Reeves as Maggie Ross.

20th-century American women writers
20th-century American non-fiction writers
American spiritual writers
Ascetics
1941 births
Living people
Madeira School alumni
Pseudonymous women writers
American women non-fiction writers
20th-century pseudonymous writers
21st-century American women